Wertkauf was a German retail group that had 21 markets until its takeover by the US supermarket chain Wal-Mart in 1997. The group's head office was in Karlsruhe.

History 
The first branch opened in 1958 in Karlsruhe. In 1966, a value purchase center with 3,500 m2 was opened in Freiburg. The new Karlsruhe shopping center built during  was destroyed on 26 August 1969 during one of the worst major fires in the history of the city. After that it was rebuilt in the same place and slightly expanded.

Eight years later, the second sales office in Freiburg was opened, covering an area of 6,000 square metres. In 1968, the company built the largest European self-service department store in Munich Euro-Industriepark with an area of 13,500 m2. High shelves were used for storage, and the goods were handled by forklift.

The chain has generated annual sales of up to 1.5 billion euros with approximately 6,000 employees.

The owners were Hugo Mann, and his wife Rosmarie, née Porst, who had also founded the furniture chain Mann Mobilia, from which value was later developed and then split off.

In 1997, Wertkauf was sold to the American retail chain Walmart. After an economic failure, the entire German branch of Walmart was sold to the Metro Group in 2006.

References 

Retail companies of Germany
German companies established in 1958
German companies disestablished in 1997
1997 mergers and acquisitions
Walmart